The Promotion to the Bundesliga was an end-of-season competition, held annually to determine the clubs that were promoted from the Regionalligas, later the 2. Bundesliga to the Bundesliga. Originally, it was necessary because there were more second division champions than promotion spots available. From 1974 onwards, it involved only two clubs who determined the third possible promotion spot to the Bundesliga.

Leagues

1963–74
When the Bundesliga was formed in 1963, the German Football Association established five regional second divisions below it, the Regionalligas, these being:
 Regionalliga Süd
 Regionalliga Südwest
 Regionalliga West
 Regionalliga Berlin
 Regionalliga Nord

Because the boundaries of these five leagues went along historical lines, determined by the boundaries of the five German sub-federations, the playing strength of the leagues was not equal. To determine the two teams to be promoted to the Bundesliga each season, a promotion round was held. The number of teams from each Regionalliga qualified for this event was not equal, for the above-mentioned reason.

From 1963, the first two teams in each Regionalliga was qualified for the promotion round, except from Berlin, who would only send the champions. To reduce the number of clubs from nine to eight, a home-and-away decider was played between two of the runners-ups. The origin of the two teams in this altered annually. The eight teams would then play a home-and-away round in two groups of four with the winners qualified for the Bundesliga. Teams from the same Regionalliga would not play in the same group. This system was in place till 1966.

From 1967, the groups were expanded to five clubs and all five Regionalligas send their runners-up to the competition. Otherwise, the modus remained unchanged. This system remained in place until 1974, when the Regionalligas were disbanded.

1974–81
In 1974, the five Regionalligas were replaced by two 2. Bundesligas, those being:
 2. Bundesliga Süd
 2. Bundesliga Nord

The two league champions would now be directly promoted to the Bundesliga while the two runners-up played a home-and-away round to determine the third promoted team. This system remained in place until the single 2. Bundesliga replaced the two leagues.

1981–91
With the introduction of the single-division 2. Bundesliga in 1981, a promotion round would have become unnecessary as the top-three teams could have been directly promoted. Instead, only the top two teams achieved direct promotion. The third-placed club had to play the 16th placed club from the Bundesliga in a home-and-away round for the last spot in the first division. This series was played until 1991.

With the German reunion in 1991 and the influx of clubs from the former DDR-Oberliga, the promotion round between the two clubs was stopped. In the 1990–91 season, five clubs were promoted to the Bundesliga, three from the west and two from the east.

1991–92
As a transition season due to the integration of the East German clubs, only two clubs were promoted from the second to the first division. Also, the 2. Bundesliga was split into two regional groups for this season.

1992–2008
In this era, the top three teams of the 2. Bundesliga were directly promoted to the Bundesliga.

2008–present
From 2009, the promotion series between the 16th-placed Bundesliga club and the third-placed 2. Bundesliga team was reestablished. The Bundesliga follows its own past example as well as the one set by the English Premier League, French Ligue 1, and Italian Serie A, where these games are in place too and quite popular.

Promoted teams

1963–74

 In 1965, Tasmania Berlin was promoted to replace Hertha BSC in the league, without having qualified for it.

1974–81

1981–90

1990–91

1991–92

1992–present

 Number in brackets behind club denotes the number of promotion when there was more than one.

Clubs taking part in the promotion round

Participating clubs (1963–74)
The southern clubs:

The northern clubs:

 Bold denotes promoted team.
 In 1964, Wuppertaler SV lost to FK Pirmasens 1–2 and 0–2 in the qualifying, missing out on the promotion round.
 In 1965, FC St.Pauli lost to SSV Reutlingen 1–0 and 1–4 aet in the qualifying, missing out on the promotion round.
 In 1966, SC Göttingen 05 lost to 1. FC Saarbrücken 0–3 and 0–4 in the qualifying, missing out on the promotion round.

North-South promotion games (1974–1981)
1974–75

|}

1975–76

|}

1976–77

|}

1977–78

|}

1978–79

|}

1979–80

|}

1980–81

|}

Bundesliga versus 2. Bundesliga (1981–91)
 1981–82

|}

 1982–83

|}

 1983–84

|}

 1984–85

|}

 1985–86

|}

 1986–87

|}

 1987–88

|}

 1988–89

|}

 1989–90

|}

 1990–91

|}

Bundesliga versus 2. Bundesliga (2008–present)
 2008–09

|}

 2009–10

|}

 2010–11

|}

 2011–12

|}

 2012–13

|}

 2013–14

|}

 2014–15

|}

 2015–16

|}

2016–17

|}

2017–18

|}

2018–19

|}

2019–20

2020–21

2021–22

Key
 Winner in bold.

See also
 Promotion to the 2. Bundesliga
 Promotion to the 3. Liga

References

Sources
 Deutsche Liga Chronik seit 1945  Historic tables of German football (First, Second and Third Division), publisher: DSFS, published: 2006
 kicker Almanach 1990  Yearbook of German football, publisher: kicker, published: 1989,

External links
Official Bundesliga website

German football promotion rounds
Bundesliga